Hon. Phineas Bruce (June 7, 1762 – October 4, 1809) was a U.S. Representative from Massachusetts who was unable to serve in the U.S. Congress due to his declining health.

Biography

Phineas Bruce was born in Mendon in the Province of Massachusetts Bay on June 7, 1762. He received a classical education and was graduated from Yale College in 1786. He studied law.

He was admitted to the bar in 1790 and commenced practice in Machias, Maine (then a district of Massachusetts). He served as member of the Massachusetts House of Representatives 1791-1798 and in 1800.

Bruce was elected as a Federalist to the Eighth Congress commencing March 4, 1803 – 1805, but was prevented by illness from qualifying. He died in Uxbridge, Massachusetts, October 4, 1809 and was interred in the Old Burying Ground and later reinterred in Prospect Hill Cemetery.

Sources

1762 births
1809 deaths
Members of the United States House of Representatives from the District of Maine
Yale College alumni
People from Uxbridge, Massachusetts
People from Machias, Maine
Federalist Party members of the United States House of Representatives from Massachusetts